Helmuth Fischer (29 January 1911 – 29 February 1996) was a German swimmer who won a silver medal in the 100 m freestyle at the 1934 European Aquatics Championships. He also competed at the 1936 Summer Olympics and finished fifth in the 100 m freestyle and 4 × 200 m freestyle relay.

References

1911 births
1996 deaths
German male swimmers
Swimmers at the 1936 Summer Olympics
Olympic swimmers of Germany
European Aquatics Championships medalists in swimming
German male freestyle swimmers
Sportspeople from Bremerhaven
20th-century German people